Kağan Söylemezgiller (born 4 March 1988) is a Turkish footballer who plays as an attacking midfielder.

References

External links
 Guardian Stats Centre
 

1988 births
Living people
Turkish footballers
TFF First League players
TFF Second League players
Süper Lig players
Swiss Challenge League players
VfL Kirchheim/Teck players
Stuttgarter Kickers players
VfB Stuttgart players
FC Wil players
MKE Ankaragücü footballers
Kardemir Karabükspor footballers
Şanlıurfaspor footballers
Gümüşhanespor footballers
Fethiyespor footballers
Adanaspor footballers
Turkey B international footballers
Association football midfielders
Expatriate footballers in Switzerland
Sportspeople from Stuttgart